Fairmont Mountain is a  summit located in British Columbia, Canada.

Description

Situated in the Stanford Range of the Kootenay Ranges of the Canadian Rockies, this prominent peak is visible from Highway 93. The peak is situated five kilometers southeast of Fairmont Hot Springs and five kilometers northeast of Columbia Lake. Topographic relief is significant as the summit rises 1,820 meters (5,970 ft) above the Rocky Mountain Trench in five kilometers. Precipitation runoff from the mountain drains east into tributaries of the Kootenay River and west into tributaries of the Columbia River.

History

The mountain was named in association with Fairmont Hot Springs Post Office. The toponym was officially adopted 3 February 1954 when approved by the Geographical Names Board of Canada.

Climate

Based on the Köppen climate classification, Fairmont Mountain has a subarctic climate with cold, snowy winters, and mild summers.

See also
Geography of British Columbia

References

External links
 Weather forecast: Fairmont Mountain

Two-thousanders of British Columbia
Canadian Rockies
Kootenay Land District